Visions of the Beast was released by Iron Maiden on 2 June 2003 and contains every promotional video through 2001's Rock in Rio. It is basically an updated version of The First Ten Years: The Videos and From There to Eternity. It also includes never-before-seen Camp Chaos animated versions of six definitive Iron Maiden songs, interactive menus and discographies, and some special hidden extras.

Track listing

 Uses clips of Charlie Chaplin films.
 To access this easter egg on disc 1, play track 6 ("The Trooper") three consecutive times, to form 666... "The Number of the Beast".
 To access this easter egg on disc 2, play track 6 ("Hallowed Be Thy Name") twice, then track 4 ("Wasting Love"), in consecutive order, to form 664.

Personnel
Production credits are adapted from the DVD liner notes.
Iron Maiden
Steve Harris – bass guitar, director (Disc one; tracks 12 to 16, Disc two; tracks 1, 8 to 10), editor (Disc one; tracks 12 to 16, Disc two; tracks 1, 3, 5, 6, 8 to 10, 12 and 15), producer (Disc one; tracks 19 to 21, Disc two; tracks 5 to 13, 15)
Dave Murray – guitar
Paul Di'Anno – lead vocals (Disc one; tracks 1 and 2)
Bruce Dickinson – lead vocals (Disc one; tracks 3 to 18, 19, Disc two; tracks 1 to 6, 13 to 19)
Blaze Bayley – lead vocals (Disc one; tracks 19 and 21, Disc two: tracks 7 to 12)
Dennis Stratton – guitar (Disc one; track 1)
Adrian Smith – guitar (Disc one; tracks 2 to 14, 17 and 18, Disc two; tracks 13 to 19)
Janick Gers – guitar (Disc one; tracks 15, 16, 19 and 21, Disc two; tracks 1 to 16)
Clive Burr – drums (Disc one; tracks 1 to 4, 18, Disc two; track 17)
Nicko McBrain – drums (Disc one; tracks 5 to 17, 19 to 21, Disc two; tracks 1 to 16, 18 and 19)
Production
Doug Smith – director (Disc one; track 1)
Dave Hillier – director (Disc one; track 2)
David Mallet – director (Disc one; tracks 3 and 4)
Jim Yukich – director (Disc one; tracks 5, 6, 8 and 9)
Tony Halton – director (Disc one; track 7)
Julian Caidan – director (Disc one ; tracks 10 and 13)
Julian Doyle – director (Disc one; track 11)
Toby Philips – director (Disc one; track 12)
Wing Ko – director (Disc two; tracks 2 and 7)
E. Matthies – director (Disc two; track 2)
Ralph Ziman – director (Disc two; track 3)
Samuel Bayer – director (Disc two; tracks 4 to 6)
Steve Lazarus – director (Disc two; tracks 8 to 10, 12), editor (Disc two; tracks 8, 10, 12)
Simon Hilton – director (Disc two; track 11)
Dean Karr – director (Disc one; track 20, Disc two; tracks 13 and 15)
Dave Pattenden – director (Disc two; track 14)
Trevor Thompson – director (Disc two; track 14)
Bob Cesca – director (Disc one; tracks 17 and 18, Disc two; tracks 16 to 19)
Jerry Behrens – editor (Disc one; tracks 12 and 13)
Will Malone – producer (Disc one; track 1)
Doug Hall – producer (Disc one; track 2)
Martin Birch – producer (Disc one; tracks 3 to 18, Disc two; tracks 17 to 19)
Tony Wilson – producer (Disc one; track 13)
Nigel Green – producer (Disc one; tracks 19 and 21, Disc two; tracks 7 to 12)
Kevin Shirley – producer (Disc one; track 20, Disc two; tracks 13 to 16)
Peacock – sleeve illustration, sleeve design
Rod Smallwood – management
Andy Taylor – management
Merck Mercuriadis – management

Charts

Certifications

References

External links
 Visions of the Beast (VHS/DVD) at the Internet Movie Database

Iron Maiden video albums
EMI Records video albums
2003 video albums
EMI Records compilation albums
2003 compilation albums
Music video compilation albums